James River High School (JRHS) is a Group-2A-size public high school in Buchanan, Virginia. It serves the northern part of Botetourt County, including the towns of Buchanan, Eagle Rock, Fincastle, and Springwood. James River was founded in 1959 with the consolidation of the Buchanan, Eagle Rock, and Fincastle high schools.

FFA Organization
In June 2017, the James River FFA Chapter was named the #1 FFA Chapter in Virginia through the National Chapter Award. 
In October 2017, the chapter was named as a Model of Excellence Finalist and one of the top 10 FFA Chapters in the country.

Sports
James River athletes are referred to as the "Knights" and they compete in the Three Rivers District against similarly sized schools in the Roanoke and New River Valleys.  James River is classified as a Class 2, Region C school by the Virginia High School League for Regional and State competitions. 

The Knights have captured four Group A State Championships in Women's Softball in 2003, 2004, 2006, and 2011.  Pitcher Angela Tincher graduated from James River before having an All-American college career and playing professional softball. The Knights also won states in Group A Men's Basketball in 2010. James River has a successful volleyball team, winning the State Championship in 2010.

Drama
JRHS advanced to the Virginia State Theatre Competition in Charlottesville in 2007. The "Knightly" players won second in the Region C Theatre Competition earlier in November 2007.

Marching band
The James River Marching Knight Band is under the direction of Kevin English. The Marching Knights participate in many competitions in and out of state and have received honors, such as Band of the Day at the Lord Botetourt Cavalier Classic in 2016.

Past Shows include: Minutes to Midnight (2010), Rock 'n Roll Road Trip (2011), Blues Brothers (2012), We Will Rock You (2013), Pirate Radio (2014), Power of Love (2015), Man of Steel (2016), Grimm Tales (2017), Les Miserables (2018), and Time After Time (2019).

Notable alumni
 Angela Tincher, Akron Racers professional softball pitcher 
 Matthew Ramsey, songwriter and lead vocalist of Old Dominion

References



Public high schools in Virginia
Educational institutions established in 1959
Schools in Botetourt County, Virginia
1959 establishments in Virginia